Esra Erol Özbir (born 12 May 1982) is a Turkish television presenter.

Erol was born on 12 May 1982 in Istanbul to Necla Sinoplu and Seyfi Erol, a policeman. She has four sisters. She studied china ceramics design at a high school in Kütahya and continued her education at an open plan school. Esra Erol, who took a diction course at Maltepe University, subsequently studied at Marmara University's radio-television department. Erol first came to attention with the program Turkuaz on Kanal D. She then started to present a marriage program on Flash TV with the program Dest-i İzdivaç and soon became a familiar face on national channels. She is a recipient of three Golden Butterfly Awards for Best Female TV Presenter.

Filmography

TV programs 
 2003 - Siemens Mobile Kuşak (Teknoloji TV)
 2005–2007 - Turkuaz (Kanal D)
 2007 - Esra Erol'la Dest-i İzdivaç (Flash TV)
 2008 - Esra Erol'la İzdivaç (Star TV)
 2009–2013 - Esra Erol'da Evlen Benimle (ATV)
 2013–2015 - Esra Erol'la (Fox)
 2015–present - Esra Erol'da (ATV)

TV series 
 Kalp Gözü (Kanal 7) - 2004
 Cennet Mahallesi (Show TV) - 2004
 Çemberimde Gül Oya - 2005
 Tuzak - 2005
 Alemin Kıralı (episode 56) (ATV) - 2012
 Yalan Dünya (Kanal 7) - 2012

Film 
 Başkan (TV film) - 2005
 Kanal-İ-Zasyon - 2009
 Kamerayla İzdivaç - 2010

Awards

References

External links 
 
 

1982 births
Turkish television presenters
Turkish women television presenters
Living people
Turkish television producers
Turkish television actresses